Xu Guoqing (born 17 April 1958) is a Chinese judoka. He competed at the 1984 Summer Olympics and the 1988 Summer Olympics.

References

1958 births
Living people
Chinese male judoka
Olympic judoka of China
Judoka at the 1984 Summer Olympics
Judoka at the 1988 Summer Olympics
People from Liaoning
People from Dandong
Sportspeople from Dandong
People from Donggang, Liaoning
Judoka at the 1986 Asian Games
Asian Games medalists in judo
Asian Games silver medalists for China
Medalists at the 1986 Asian Games
20th-century Chinese people
21st-century Chinese people